Gary Hines (born March 21, 1984 in Atlanta) is an American handball player who plays professionally in Germany.

Career
He began to play handball with 14 years in Atlanta because he was too short for basketball. Between 2009 and 2010 he played for DJK Waldbüttelbrunn in the Bayernliga. 2010 he moved to HSC Bad Neustadt and has played in the 3. Liga since.

National Team
He scored 12 goals in his first international game for Team USA. The next day there was an article "The Hangtime Hines Show" which resulted in his nickname "Hangtime Hines".

Private life 
His mother had drug and drink problems and never told his father that he has a son. 

Between the age of 7 and 14 he grew up in foster care.

From the age of 14 he lived with one family.

Ninja Warrior
Hines compete at the Ninja Warrior Germany 2016, 2017 and 2018. 2016 and 2017 he reached the final. 2018, 2019, 2020 and 2021 he reached the semifinal. In 2022 he competed in American Ninja Warrior.

References

External links
USA Team Handball profil

1984 births
Living people
Sportspeople from Atlanta
American male handball players
American expatriates in Germany
Perimeter College at Georgia State University alumni
Pan American Games bronze medalists for the United States
Pan American Games medalists in handball
Handball players at the 2003 Pan American Games
Handball players at the 2011 Pan American Games
Handball players at the 2019 Pan American Games
Medalists at the 2003 Pan American Games